Patna Monorail was a proposed monorail system for the city of Patna.

Network
There were 4 lines proposed to be built. RITES, the consultancy arm of Indian Railways had begun soil inspection as well as ground survey for the monorail network.

 Patna Junction to Gandhi Maidan.
 Patna Junction to Patliputra Colony.
 Patna Junction to Lok Nayak Jayaprakash Airport.
 Patna Junction to Kankarbagh.

Project detail
The total estimated cost of the project was 2000-2500 Crore. The total length of the proposed 4 monorail corridors in Patna would be 32 km and in the first phase route length between 20 km and 25 km was to be completed.

As of 2021 the project has not commenced.

See also
 Patna metro

References

Proposed monorails in India
Transport in Patna